Judo competitions at the 2022 Bolivarian Games in Valledupar, Colombia were held from 25 to 28 June 2022 at Coliseo Colegio Bilingüe.

Fifteen medal events were scheduled to be contested; seven weight categories each for men and women and one mixed team event. A total of 80 athletes (44 men and 36 women) competed in the events. The events were open competitions without age restrictions.

Venezuela, who were the competition defending champions after Santa Marta 2017, won the judo competitions again after winning 6 of the 15 gold medals at stake.

Participating nations
A total of 9 nations (all the 7 ODEBO nations and 2 invited) registered athletes for the judo events. Each nation was able to enter a maximum of 14 judokas (up to 7 per gender). Each nation could register a maximum of one judoka for the individual events and a team composed by six judokas (3 men and 3 women) for the team mixed event.

The participation of judokas from Guatemala was expected, but finally they did not take part.

Venue
The judo competitions were originally scheduled to be held at Coliseo de Combate Óscar Muñoz located within the Centro de Alto Rendimiento La Gota Fría, however, they were eventually held at Coliseo of Fundación Colegio Bilingüe in Valledupar.

Medal summary

Medal table

Medalists

Men's events

Women's events

Mixed event

References

External links
 
 Bolivarianos Valledupar 2022 Judo

2022 Bolivarian Games
2022
Bolivarian Games
Judo competitions in Colombia